Saint Paulinus of Trier (died 358) was bishop of Trier and a supporter of Athanasius in the conflict with Arianism. At the Synod of Arles (353) he was targeted by the Arians, and was exiled to Phrygia, being effectively singled out by the Emperor Constantius II. He died in exile five years later, but his remains were returned to Trier in 395. His tomb is in the crypt of the city's St. Paulinus' Church, which was rededicated to him.

Paulinus was from Gascony and educated in the cathedral school at Poitiers. He travelled to Germany with Maximin of Trier, whom he succeeded as bishop. He is a Catholic and Orthodox saint (feast day August 31).

References

External links
August 31 in German History 

358 deaths
4th-century bishops in Germania
Gallo-Roman saints
Saints of Germania
4th-century Christian saints
Roman Catholic bishops of Trier
Year of birth unknown